Carlos Terán Díaz (born 24 September 2000) is a Colombian professional footballer who plays as a defender for Major League Soccer club Chicago Fire.

Club career
Born in Turbo, Colombia, Terán began his career with Categoría Primera A club Envigado. He made his professional debut for the club on 30 January 2019 against Deportivo Pasto, starting in a 1–1 draw. He ended his first season with Envigado appearing in 13 matches, starting 12.

Chicago Fire
On 21 August 2020, Terán joined American Major League Soccer club Chicago Fire. He made his debut on 28 October in a 2–1 defeat against the Philadelphia Union, coming on as a 78th minute substitute.

International career
Terán has represented Colombia at both the iunder-20 and iunder-23 sides. He made his debut for the Colombia under-20's on 23 May 2019 against Poland U20, coming on as a substitute. Terán was then selected into the Colombia under-23 squad for the CONMEBOL Pre-Olympic Tournament in 2020, making his debut on 18 January 2020 against Argentina U23. starting in a 3–1 defeat.

Career statistics

References

External links
 Profile at Chicago Fire

2000 births
Living people
Colombian footballers
Association football defenders
Envigado F.C. players
Chicago Fire FC players
Categoría Primera A players
Major League Soccer players
Colombia youth international footballers
Colombian expatriate footballers
Expatriate soccer players in the United States
Sportspeople from Antioquia Department
Colombia under-20 international footballers
MLS Next Pro players
Colombian expatriate sportspeople in the United States
Chicago Fire FC II players